Kurti (also Romanized as Kūrtī; also known as Gūtāy and Kūrtāy) is a village in Rahal Rural District, in the Central District of Khoy County, West Azerbaijan Province, Iran. At the 2006 census, its population was 863, in 181 families.

References 

Populated places in Khoy County